Rosehill Intermediate is a decile 3 school situated in Papakura, Auckland, catering for Years 7 and 8 students.

Located approximately 30 minutes south of Auckland CBD, on the southern edge of the Auckland metropolitan area, the school draws students from a large number of schools around the area including Papakura and Manurewa. It has a growing roll and most students move on to nearby Rosehill College. The school also hosts two satellite classes for Rosehill Special School.

The school community is diverse, with 31% of students identifying as Māori, and another 14% of other Pacific heritage, with approximately 16 different languages spoken in students' homes.

Rosehill Intermediate's school motto is Whaia Kia Kaha – To Seek With Vigour. The school has three key values to support students' learning – Respect, Integrity and Self-Management.

Notes

Intermediate schools in Auckland